Tapas & Beijos (English: Slaps & Kisses) is a Brazilian comedy television series that aired on Rede Globo from 5 April 2011 to 15 September 2015. It was created by Cláudio Paiva, directed by Maurício Farias and starring Andréa Beltrão and Fernanda Torres as Sueli and Fatima, respectively.

Plot
Tapas & Beijos is a series about friendship and the unexpected elements of love in the lives of inseparable friends Sueli (Andréa Beltrão) and Fatima (Fernanda Torres). Clad in their identical uniforms, they work at Djalma Brides in Copacabana, Rio de Janeiro, helping brides-to-be fulfill their dreams with the perfect wedding dress. In the process, the girls hope to find their own prince charming, which proves to be no easy task.
 
Sueli was married for two months to fun-loving Jurandir, a slacker who avoids work at all cost. He never fails to torment her life, especially since he is a waiter at the restaurant next door to Djalma Brides. Although she is still attracted to him, she becomes smitten by Jorge, a handsome newcomer who arrives to cause a stir in her bachelorette life. Outspoken Fatima has to deal with the quirky situations of dating Armane, a seductive married man who swears that someday they will have a relationship that goes beyond working hours. He owns a gift shop nearby and they are either constantly swearing love to one another or at each other's throat. Djalma and Flavia make up the lovey-dovey married couple who own the wedding dress store. Flavia, who is also an employee at the store, does not cut the girls any slack and loves to boss them around.
 
The girls love to hang out and eat at Chalita's restaurant, the place next door. Chalita is an offbeat widower who has a crush on Sueli and is in pursuit of a wife to make him happy. Sueli can count on Saint Anthony, who comes to life and gives her bold advice on love or listens to her repeated complaints about the men in her life. But eventually, in the second season, all of the girls' romantic efforts pay off when Sueli marries Jorge and Fatima marries Armane in one outlandish ceremony. But that does not mean the girls will have it any easier, they must now adapt to the rollercoaster of married life. Despite all their romantic setbacks, Fatima and Sueli never lose their sense of humor in a hilarious attempt to handle their love lives.

Cast and characters

Main
 Andréa Beltrão as Sueli Cardoso
 Fernanda Torres as Fátima de Souza
 Fábio Assunção as Jorgeney "Jorge" Almeida
 Vladimir Brichta as Armane Barbosa
 Otávio Müller as Djalma Mattos
 Fernanda de Freitas as Flávia Mattos (Flavinha)
  as Jurandir dos Santos
  as Tavares/Santo Antônio
 Malu Rodrigues as Maria Beatriz Almeida (Bia)
  as Tijolo
 Flávio Migliaccio as Chalita Said
 Natália Lage as Lucilene (seasons 2–5)
  as Stephanie (seasons 3–5)
  as Shirley Said (seasons 4–5)
  as Mustafá Said Al-Masi (season 5)

Awards and nominations

References

2010s comedy television series
2011 Brazilian television series debuts
2015 Brazilian television series endings
Brazilian comedy television series
Portuguese-language television shows
Rede Globo original programming
Television series set in shops
Television shows set in Rio de Janeiro (city)